Wedding Bells may refer to:

 Wedding Bells (play), a 1919 American play
 Wedding Bells (1921 film), an American silent film based on the 1919 play
 Wedding Bells (1933 film), a short animated film
 Wedding Bells (1954 film), a 1954 West German drama film
 Royal Wedding, a 1951 musical released as Wedding Bells in the UK
The Wedding Bells, a 2007 comedy-drama series cancelled after a few episodes aired
"Wedding Bells", an episode of Are You Being Served?
"Wedding Bells", an episode of Walker, Texas Ranger
"Wedding Bells", an episode of the British sitcom Hi-de-Hi!
 "Wedding Bells" (Godley & Creme song), 1981
 "Wedding Bells" (Jonas Brothers song), 2013
 "Wedding Bells" (Hank Williams song)

See also 
 No Wedding Bells, a 1923 film starring Oliver Hardy
 "No Wedding Bells for Him", a 1923 short story by P. G. Wodehouse
 "Wedding Bells Are Breaking Up That Old Gang of Mine", a 1929 barbershop song